Ward-Beck Systems commonly referred to as Ward-Beck or simply WBS, is a Canadian manufacturer of broadcast audio and video equipment. It was founded in a garage in April 1967 by Ron W. Ward and director of engineering, Rodger K. Beck.

On January 26, 2021, Ward-Beck announced that it would "cease manufacturing operations" effective January 31, 2021, and that the company's intellectual property is available for sale.

Products

Date of manufacture
The first two digits of the module or console's serial number dictate the year of manufacturing.

Mixing consoles
WBS 69075
WBS 73065
WBS 73050
WBS 74062
WBS 77075
WBS 74066
WBS 800278
WBS 820322

Mixing console components
WBS M124 Line Amplifier
WBS M166 Summing Amplifier
WBS M166A Summing Amplifier
WBS M201 Relay
WBS M202 Logic Latch
WBS M207 Phantom Power Card
WBS M402 Equalizer
WBS M402A Equalizer
WBS M402B Equalizer
WBS M404A High Pass / Low Pass Filter
WBS M405 Portable Extended Range VU Meter
WBS M405F Rack Mounted Extended Range VU Meter
WBS M406 Compressors
WBS M411 Stereo/Mono Transcription Preamplifier
WBS M412 Oscillator
WBS M413 Talk-back and Assign
WBS M420 Reverb Return
WBS M433 Peak Program Meter
WBS M434 Peak Program Meter
WBS M435 VU Meter
WBS M436 VU Meter
WBS M441 Mic / Line Pre-Amplifier
WBS M441D Mic / Line Pre-Amplifier
WBS M441M Mic / Line Pre-Amplifier
WBS M450A Program Amplifier
WBS M450B Program - Summing Amplifier
WBS M451 Slate
WBS M452 Oscillator
WBS M451 Talkback
WBS M452 Oscillator
WBS M453A Cue Amplifier
WBS M454 Slate Assign
WBS M455 Auxiliary Returns
WBS M457A Pre-Mixer Master
WBS M460 Input
WBS M460A Input
WBS M460B Input
WBS M460L Input
WBS M460LA Input
WBS M460M Input
WBS M460T  Input
WBS M461 Input
WBS M461A Stereo Input s
WBS M462 Equalizer
WBS M462A Equalizer
WBS M462B Equalizer
WBS M463 Sub master
WBS M463A Sub master
WBS M463AB Sub master
WBS M463AC Sub master
WBS M463J Sub master
WBS M463K Sub master
WBS M463L Sub master
WBS M463LA Sub master
WBS M464 High Pass Low Pass Filter
WBS M465 Reverb return
WBS M465B Dual Mix down
WBS M466 Compressor/Limiter/De-esser
WBS M466C Compressor/Limiter/De-esser
WBS M466M Meter  for M466
WBS M467 Noise Gate and Meter
WBS M468A 8 X 1 High Level Switcher
WBS M470 Pre-amp / Line Input
WBS M470A Pre-amp / Line Input
WBS M470C Pre-amp / Line Input
WBS M470D Pre-amp / Line Input
WBS M470E Pre-amp / Line Input
WBS M471 Stereo Input
WBS M471A Stereo Input
WBS M471C Stereo Input
WBS M472 Equalizer
WBS M472A Stereo Equalizer
WBS M473 Sub master
WBS M473A Sub master
WBS M473B Stereo Sub master
WBS M475 Monitor
WBS M475A Stereo Monitor
WBS M477 Master Summing
WBS M479 Dual Auxiliary
WBS M480B Pre-amp
WBS M480C Input
WBS M481 Oscillator / Cue Amplifier
WBS M481B Cue OSC Re-entry
WBS M482B Monitor
WBS M484 Summing Amplifier
WBS M484A Summing Amplifier
WBS M485B 25V power Supply
WBS M487 Dual Master
WBS M487 Dual Master
WBS M487 Pre-amp
WBS M490A Microphone Input
WBS M490F Input
WBS M490F Stereo Input
WBS M490G Mic Input
WBS M490H Line Input
WBS M490J Mic Input
WBS M490K Line Input
WBS M490L Stereo Input
WBS M490M Stereo Input
WBS M490N Stereo Input
WBS M494 Remote Line / Cue
WBS M495 Stereo Monitor
WBS M497A Dual Master
WBS M497B Dual Master
WBS M497C Dual Master
WBS M497D Dual Master
WBS M498 16 X 2 Stereo Switcher
WBS M498A 10 X 1 Selector
WBS M520K Stereo Input
WBS M522 - Equalizer
WBS M522A - Equalizer
WBS M522B - Equalizer
WBS M522C  Equalizer
WBS M562 Equalizer
WBS M562B Equalizer
WBS M566 Compressor/Limiter/De-esser
WBS M567 Noise Gate and Meter
WBS M600 Universal Audio Amplifier
WBS M604 Dual Frequency Oscillator
WBS M606
WBS M605A Audio DA
WBS M608 Audio DA
WBS M609 Remote Sensitivity Audio DA
WBS M610 10 Watt Monitor Amplifier
WBS M612 Audio DA
WBS M612A Audio DA
WBS M624 Power Supply
WBS M625A Power Supply
WBS M625B Power Supply
WBS M632 Power Supply
WBS M648 Power Supply
WBS M666 Power Amplifier

Intercom and other components
WBS M8200 Microphone Preamplifier

Customers and users
Canadian Broadcasting Corporation
CTV Television Network
VOA
XM Radio
NEP Broadcasting
NBC
American Broadcasting Company
CNN
The CHUM Group
Much Music
Bravo!
Rawlco Radio
Rogers Communications
Corus Entertainment
Bill Kennedy
Hotel2Tango
Bedside Studios
Doug Grean
Maritime Broadcasting System

Ward-Beck Systems Preservation Society (WBSPS)
The Ward-Beck Systems Preservation Society was founded in 2005 by Tony Kuzub. The goal and objective of the WBSPS is to keep vintage Ward-Beck equipment running and working by supplying a database of documentation, knowledge, and support.  There are only a handful of consoles still in existence and use, and the WBSPS is dedicated to keeping these consoles in use and maintained.  Many manuals have been scanned in their entirety and posted for all to learn from. The WBSPS was given permission by Eugene Johnson of Ward-Beck to publish information regarding vintage WBS equipment.  The WBSPS is not directly or in-directly associated with Ward-Beck Systems Incorporated.  A Letter of permission from Ward-Beck Systems

References

External links
Ward-Beck Systems Official Website
Ward-Beck Systems Preservation Society
WBS Industry Canada Profile

Audio amplifier manufacturers
Manufacturing companies based in Toronto
Manufacturers of professional audio equipment
Radio electronics
Audio mixing console manufacturers
Audio equipment manufacturers of Canada